Aechmea muricata is a plant species in the genus Aechmea. This species is endemic to eastern Brazil, known from the States of Pernambuco and Alagoas.

References

muricata
Flora of Brazil
Plants described in 1810